The Cardinals–Dodgers rivalry is a Major League Baseball (MLB) National League rivalry played between the St. Louis Cardinals and the Los Angeles Dodgers. The Cardinals and Dodgers are two of the most successful franchises in the National League, combining for 18 World Series titles. St. Louis and Los Angeles are approximately 1,824 miles apart along Route 66.

Background
Both the Dodgers and Cardinals are two of the oldest franchises in the MLB, having first met during the 1900 season during the league's infancy. The Cardinals franchise (originally known as the Browns) began in 1882 and the Dodgers franchise (originally known as the Bridegrooms) began in 1883. Since divisions were instituted in 1969, the teams have not played in the same division. However, frequent close pennant races and matchups in the postseason caused the rivalry to grow in intensity through the decades, particularly during the mid 1960s when from 1963-1968 either team represented the National League in the World Series or the 2000s when the two teams regularly met in the postseason. Both teams have met each other 1,989 times in the regular season, with 24 postseason games between them. The Cardinals currently have the most regular season wins at 999, and the most postseason wins at 14.

Though not as heated as the Dodgers-Giants or Cardinals-Cubs rivalries, there is more mutual respect between both teams; though brief moments of animosity still occurred.

History

1940s: First hints at a rivalry and Integration 
The Cardinals-Dodgers rivalry was particularly intense from 1941 through 1949.  In his autobiography written in 1948, Leo Durocher, who managed the Dodgers for most of the 1940s, described the Cardinals as being "our old rivals."  During this period, the Cardinals won the National League pennant 4 times (with the Dodgers finishing 2nd twice) and the Dodgers won the National League pennant 3 times (with the Cardinals finishing 2nd each time).  In 1942 the Cardinals overcame a 10 game Dodger lead in early August to win the pennant.  In 1946 the Cardinals and Dodgers finished the regular season tied for first place but the Cardinals won the pennant when they prevailed in the first ever playoff tiebreaker in the National League.  Cardinal Hall of Famer Enos Slaughter said during this period of the Cardinals-Dodgers rivalry that "We loved to hate them and they loved to hate us."

During this period, after the 1942 season, Branch Rickey, who had built up the Cardinals farm system as their general manager moved to become the Dodgers' general manager.  In 1947, after Rickey broke the color line by signing Jackie Robinson to the Dodgers, there were rumors that southerners playing for the Cardinals were planning to boycott games against the Dodgers, although the players later denied it. In general, the Cardinals were latecomers to integration. Front-office executive Bing Devine said the owner from 1947 to 1953, Fred Saigh, refused to sign black players. There was a widespread belief that St. Louis was, in many ways, a Southern city. In the mid-1950s many of its stores and restaurants refused to serve black customers. The Cardinals, with baseball’s largest radio network blanketing the Midwest and South, had cultivated white Southern fans. Their ballpark was also the last in the majors to abolish segregated seating. Because of their lack of black players, the Cardinals play suffered on the field tremendously in the 1950s. Meanwhile, with the success of Robinson, the Dodgers doubled down on the opportunity to sign players of color from the Negro leagues. In the subsequent years after their pennant-winning season in 1947, they would sign Don Newcombe, Roy Campanella, and Jim Gilliam from the Negro leagues, adding to an already tremendous team. The Dodgers made the World Series in 1949, 1952, 1953, 1955, 1956, and 1959 (winning championships in 1955 and 1959) and were a historic pennant race away from making it in 1951, in part because they were the first to accept African American players. The 1951 season included a 14-game winning streak for the Dodgers against the Cardinals, the longest such streak in the rivalry.

1960s: Dodgers move West, the 1963 pennant race, and alternating World Series appearances
By their 1959 World Series victory, the Dodgers had moved from Brooklyn to Los Angeles the previous year. The Dodgers (and Giants) moving to California meant that the St. Louis Cardinals were no longer the furthest team West.

The rivalry renewed in 1963 when the Cardinals won 19 out of 20 games to almost overtake a large Dodger lead in the standings, although the Dodgers ultimately prevailed to win the pennant.  The streak reminded people (including Cardinal Hall of Famer Stan Musial, who started in 1941 and was in his final season in 1963) of the 1942 performance, despite the end result. From 1963-1968, either the Cardinals or Dodgers represented the National League in the World Series. 1963, 1965, and 1966 for Los Angeles and 1964, 1967, and 1968 for St. Louis. This streak nearly extended to 1962, but the Dodgers were beaten in the 1962 National League tie-breaker by the Giants in three games. By the 1960s, some of the best Cardinals players were of color, such as Bob Gibson, Lou Brock, Curt Flood, Orlando Cepeda, and Bill White, as the team was more open to accepting players of color at this time.

For the Cardinals, the 1970s represented one of the dimmest period as a franchise as they finished the decade with a .496 winning percantage, the lowest til that point since the 1910s . The Dodgers maintained their postseason contender status, despite having a dip in performance in the late 1960s after the sudden retirement of Sandy Koufax following the 1966 World Series. In the 1970s, the Dodgers made three World Series (1974, 1977, 1978), but were defeated in all three. In some respect, the Cincinnati Reds took the Cardinals place as the Dodgers' Midwest foe, particularly throughout the mid 1970s.

1980s: First official postseason match-up, Ozzie Smith, and Pedro Guerrero for John Tudor
Since divisional baseball started in 1969, the Cardinals and Dodgers have met six times in the postseason with two meetings in the NLCS falling in favor of the Cardinals. The two teams nearly met in the 1982 National League Championship Series, but a late Dodgers collapse in the regular season prevented that from happening (the Cardinals won the 1982 pennant and World Series). In what could be considered biggest moment in the rivalry, the two teams finally played each other in the 1985 National League Championship Series for their first official postseason match-up. The series is best known for Ozzie Smith's dramatic walk-off home run in Game 5 and Jack Clark's series-winning home run in Game 6 at Dodger Stadium. To add extra significance, it was Smith's first career home-run batting left handed, as he was a switch-hitter, with all of his power coming from the right-side. Smith's Game 5 walk-off home run was voted the greatest moment in the history of Busch Stadium in 2005, and was the source of Jack Buck's famous call "Go crazy, folks! Go crazy!".

In 1988, the two teams completed a controversial, yet beneficial blockbuster trade when John Tudor was traded to the Dodgers in exchange for Pedro Guerrero at the trade deadline. The Dodgers won the World Series in 1988, as Tudor helped stabilize the Dodgers' rotation down the stretch, going 4-3 in nine starts with a 2.41 ERA, although he was mostly ineffective in the postseason. To complete the trade, Guerrero signed a three-year contract with the Cardinals. He enjoyed another All-Star season in 1989, hitting .311/.391/.477 with 17 home runs, 117 runs batted in and a league-leading 42 doubles and finished third in NL MVP voting. It was the third time he finished third in MVP voting in his career (the other two being 1982 and 1985). To date, this is the most significant trade between the Cardinals and Dodgers.

Overall in the 1980s, the Dodgers and Cardinals dominated the National League. With timely hitting, good defense, and dominant pitching, the Dodgers won two World Series in the decade (1981, 1988), made the postseason four times (1981, 1983, 1985, 1988), and played in a one-game playoff in 1980. With the omnipresent threat of the stolen base and big time clutch hitting, the Cardinals reign of dominance earned three World Series appearances in 1982, 1985, and 1987, winning their lone championship of the decade in 1982. Both teams had what could be considered a lean period for a storied franchise after this era. The Dodgers did not seriously challenge in the National League West again until 1991 and did not make the postseason again until 1995. After 1987, the Cardinals did not make the postseason again until 1996, which by this time they were in the newly created National League Central division. Additionally, Hall of Fame managers Whitey Herzog and Tommy Lasorda retired by the time the rivalry sparked again.

The next significant moments of the rivalry came during the 1990s, which were a down period for both teams. On June 29, 1990, long-time Dodgers ace pitcher Fernando Valenzuela had his last great moment of his career when he threw a no-hitter against the St. Louis Cardinals just hours after the Oakland Athletics' Dave Stewart threw one. It was only time two no-hitters were thrown on the same day. On August 10, 1995, the Cardinals-Dodgers game at Dodger Stadium was forfeited after fans hurled giveaway baseballs onto the field in disgust over bad calls and player ejections throughout the game. The Dodgers had to forfeit their game against the Cardinals with one out in the bottom of the ninth. "It was unbelievable," Dodgers manager Tommy Lasorda said at the time, according to the Los Angeles Times. "I've never seen anything like this. I'm disappointed in the ones who threw the balls, not the good fans." On April 23, 1999, St. Louis Cardinals Fernando Tatís made baseball history when he hit two grand slams in one inning. He is the only batter in MLB history to accomplish this feat. Tatís hit both of his grand slams against starting pitcher Chan Ho Park of the Los Angeles Dodgers. With these two grand slams, Tatís also set a Major League record with eight runs batted in during a single inning.

2000s-2010s: More postseason match-ups and Cardinals dominance
The Cardinals did not play the Dodgers again in the postseason until 2004 when the heavily favored Cardinals defeated the Dodgers in four games in the National League Division Series; however, the Cardinals lost the World Series to the Red Sox in a four game sweep. The 2004 NLDS was a microcosm of the Cardinals-Dodgers rivalry at this point, as St. Louis often dominated Los Angeles in the early-to-mid 2000s. The Dodgers did not even beat the Cardinals over a year and a half period (10 games from 2005 through 2007). This began to change around the time of their next meeting in 2009. In 2009, the Dodgers defeated the Cardinals in the National League Division Series in a three-game sweep. The series was highlighted by a Game 2 Matt Holliday gaffe in left-field when he lost a James Loney fly ball in the lights to put the tying run aboard. Later in the inning, pinch hitter Mark Loretta came through for Los Angeles with a single up the middle to give them the walk-off win and a commanding 2-0 series lead.

The Cardinals returned the favor, beating the Dodgers in the 2013 National League Championship Series. The Cardinals and Dodgers met again during the 2014 National League Division Series with the Cardinals winning again and getting the better of 2013-2014 Cy Young award and 2014  Most Valuable Player winner Clayton Kershaw. Between the 2013 National League Championship Series and the 2014 National League Division Series, the Cardinals beat Kershaw in all four of his starts, highlighted by a series-winning home run from Matt Adams in Game 4 of the 2014 NLDS off a tiring Kershaw in the seventh inning. Game 1 also saw a heated altercation between Cardinals’ catcher Yadier Molina and Dodgers’ outfielder Yasiel Puig culminating in both benches clearing following a stray pitch from Cardinals’ pitcher Adam Wainwright. The Dodgers season ended at the hands of the Cardinals in 2004, 2013, and 2014 and they often won the regular season series, particularly in the 2000s.

2020s: Chris Taylor walk-off
From 2000-2020, the Cardinals and Dodgers won a combined three World Series (2006, 2011 for St. Louis and 2020 for Los Angeles) and appeared in combined seven World Series. They were also perennial postseason contenders, with Los Angeles making the postseason every year from 2013-2020. Meanwhile, St. Louis made the postseason 14 of 20 seasons from 2000-2020.

The two teams met again in the postseason in the 2021 National League Wild Card Game, with the Dodgers winning in the ninth on a two-run Chris Taylor walk-off home run.

References

Major League Baseball rivalries
Los Angeles Dodgers
St. Louis Cardinals